iFunny is a humor-based website and mobile application developed by Cyprus-based FunCorp, an entertainment technology company, that consists of memes in the form of images, videos, and animated GIFs submitted by its users. The mobile version of the site once featured a built-in meme creator tool. The app describes itself as a "community for meme lovers and viral memes around the internet."

History
The application first launched on April 26, 2011, for iOS devices, and on November 25, 2011, on Android. On April 11, 2013, iFunny.co went up as the desktop alternative to the application. In the US Mobile App Report, iFunny was listed as one of the most downloaded apps in the US.

Content
iFunny is available online and as an app. It is divided into sections curated by moderators, and a section to follow subscribed accounts. It is run by David Chef, known as Cheffy by the iFunny community.

Along the left side of the homepage is the "memes catalog", in which general topics are listed including cars, gaming, and sports.

The memes are mostly still images created with images from users.

The site has guidelines that ban threats and hateful propaganda, but they do allow "dark humor". It claims to use "manual pre-moderation" to filter content that violates its guidelines. iFunny's policies allow political satire and opinion, but prohibit support for a specific candidate. The site offers a safety lock to prevent others from seeing what memes users have looked at.

Extremist incidents
Some users and content on the website have been associated with far-right extremist ideologies.

According to VICE News in November 2019, the neo-Nazi hate group "The Base" was posting recruitment propaganda on iFunny. One user "MemeMercenary" posted QR codes to encourage users to contact the extremist group.

On January 12, 2018, 20-year-old Samuel Woodward was arrested and charged with first-degree murder for the stabbing of Blaze Bernstein. Woodward is a member of the neo-Nazi terrorist group Atomwaffen Division. Woodward had a large following on iFunny under the moniker "Saboteur", and often posted content that was racist, violent, or related to white supremacy. He had drifted away from iFunny in the last year and deleted the "Saboteur" account. iFunny users turned Bernstein’s death into a meme and showed support for Woodward.

On August 7, 2019, 18-year-old Justin Olsen from Boardman, Ohio, was arrested for making posts on iFunny under his username ArmyOfChrist that supported mass shootings. The FBI found over 10,000 rounds of ammunition and 25 guns at his home. He told authorities that the posts he made were in a joking manner.

On August 16, 2019, the FBI arrested 19-year-old Farhan Sheikh for iFunny posts threatening to murder people at a women's health clinic that was less than 5 miles away from his home. On a post, he wrote that he would "proceed to slaughter and murder any doctor, patient or visitor." He posted that his iFunny account was "NOT a satirical account. I post what I mean, and i WILL carry out what I post ".

On May 28, 2020, 19-year-old Alexander Treisman was initially arrested for carrying concealed weapons and was separately indicted for possession of child pornography, but was later discovered to have made posts on Reddit and iFunny threatening to assassinate Joe Biden and Kamala Harris. In one iFunny post, he said, "Should I kill Joe Biden?". He was found in a van with four rifles, a 9mm handgun, explosive materials, and books on bomb making. Police subsequently found 6,721 images and 1,248 videos of child pornography on eight different digital devices.

On March 12, 2021, 21-year-old Joshua Doctor from Holland, Michigan, was arrested and charged with terrorism for making death threats towards Joe Biden, Nancy Pelosi, and Gretchen Whitmer on iFunny. In the posts, he wrote that he would "be the catalyst" for a revolution.

According to Chief Information Officer Denis Litvinov, the post violated the platform's policies and guidelines against violence, and was immediately removed after moderators became aware of the post.

References

External links
Official website

2011 establishments in Russia
Websites with far-right material
Internet properties established in 2011
Neo-Nazism in the United States
Alt-right Internet forums
Alt-tech
Comedy websites